The Union of Coopers, Cellar Managers, and Helpers in Germany was a trade union representing coopers and those in related trades, in Germany.

The union was founded in 1885, as a travel support association for coopers, based in Bremen.  By 1886, the organisation had 3,000 members.  By 1893, the union's membership had reached 6,000, and in 1897, it was able to appoint a full-time president, Carl Winkelmann.

The union affiliated to the General Commission of German Trade Unions, and was a founding affiliate of its successor, the General German Trade Union Federation.  By 1927, the union had 8,142 members.  That year, it merged with the Central Union of Bakers and Confectioners, the Union of Brewery and Mill Workers, and the Central Union of Butchers, to form the Union of Food and Drink Workers.

Presidents
1885: Neure
1897: Carl Winkelmann
1924:

References

Coopers' trade unions
Trade unions in Germany
Trade unions established in 1885
Trade unions disestablished in 1927